ACUF may refer to:
 American Conservative Union Foundation, a part of the political organization American Conservative Union
 Advisory Committee on Undersea Features of the United States Board on Geographic Names

See also
Acuff (disambiguation)